Yellownape may refer to the following species:

Greater yellownape (Chrysophlegma flavinucha)
Lesser yellownape (Picus chlorolophus)
Javan yellownape (Chrysophlegma mentale)

Animal common name disambiguation pages
Chrysophlegma
Picus (genus)